George Beesley (or Bisley) (born c. 1562 at The Hill in Goosnargh parish, Lancashire, England, of a Catholic family; died 2 July 1591) was an English Roman Catholic priest. He is a Catholic martyr, beatified in 1987.

Life

Blessed George Beesley was born into a Catholic family. He was ordained at the English college, Rheims, France on 14 March 1587. On November 1, 1588, he went back to England. He intended to minister and to convert Catholics during the persecutions led by Queen Elizabeth I. In 1590 he was captured and imprisoned for the crime of being a Roman Catholic priest.

He was repeatedly tortured in order to give the names of the other Catholics. Even though his health and body were battered, he did not tell his captors anything. His execution was prompted by the statute of 27 Eliz., in Fleet-street, London. His feast day is every 1 July.

See also
 Catholic Church in the United Kingdom
 Douai Martyrs
 Eighty-five martyrs of England and Wales

References

1591 deaths
16th-century English Roman Catholic priests
English beatified people
16th-century venerated Christians
People from Goosnargh
Year of birth unknown
16th-century Roman Catholic martyrs
People executed under Elizabeth I
English torture victims
Eighty-five martyrs of England and Wales